The 1985 New Mexico Lobos football team was an American football team that represented the University of New Mexico in the Western Athletic Conference (WAC) during the 1985 NCAA Division I-A football season.  In their third season under head coach Joe Lee Dunn, the Lobos compiled a 3–8 record (2–6 against WAC opponents) and were outscored by a total of 415 to 289. 

The team's statistical leaders included Billy Rucker with 2,475 passing yards, Willie Turral with 800 rushing yards and 84 points scored, and Terance Mathis with 852 receiving yards.

Schedule

References

New Mexico
New Mexico Lobos football seasons
New Mexico Lobos football